Shield Knight is a secondary character in the 2014 indie platform video game Shovel Knight. Saving Shield Knight, who is possessed by a cursed amulet turning her into the evil Enchantress, is the main objective of player-character Shovel Knight.

The character, and the dream sequences involving her, were moderately praised by critics upon Shovel Knights release. Though the character is a throwback to the common “damsel in distress” trope in 1980s platform games, reviewers were pleased with Shield Knight's active role in the story and her relatively confident character.

Conception and creation
Shield Knight was announced on September 2, 2013 as Shovel Knight's "inseparable partners in adventuring." According to Shovel Knight programmer David D'Angelo, Shield Knight was originally supposed to be a princess, as the creators were using "Roll, Peach, Zelda, and other Damsel in Distress models from the NES era" as inspirations. Originally, due to her lack of character, she was referred to as "Princess MacGuffin" within the development team.

Shield Knight was decided to become a strong hero so that, according to D'Angelo, "the connection between the player and Shield Knight would be even more powerful, as Shield Knight wouldn't be just an object—Shield Knight would be as meaningful as a loved one." Shield Knight was also originally supposed to die at the end of the game, where Shovel Knight had to bury his loved one with his own shovel. This was changed because the creators felt they hadn't developed the characters well enough yet for the ending to be effective; "it was hard to feel anything other than cheated by the death of Shield Knight."

After completing some levels in the game, a dream sequence starts where the player must catch a falling Shield Knight. According to creators Nick Wozniak and Sean Velasco, these were intended to emotionally affect the player in a similar way as Mother 3 does. Velasco described the thought process as follows:

Velasco and Wozniac have stated their interest in a possible co-op mode, where both Shovel Knight and Shield Knight are playable, though since she wasn't conceived "until halfway through development," the creators haven't pursued this concept. In the character's original reveal, she was characterized as "Confident, Powerful, and Tenacious," though occasionally reckless. Shield Knight wears a small shield on her wrist and a larger shield nearly the size of her entire body, with which she can "easily defend against melee and ranged attacks before counterattacking up close."

Body Swap mode
For Shovel Knights 2017 "body swap" downloadable content, Yacht Club created male versions of Shield Knight and the Enchantress. The "Enchanter" was one of the first body swap concepts Yacht Club explored, and his creation process led to many of the design rules Yacht Club's artists subsequently imposed on themselves. The Enchantress' design was inspired by traditional Japanese attire, so Yacht Club initially experimented with kimono and robes for her male counterpart as well. When this did not work out, artists moved on to a samurai-inspired design, similar to that of Ganondorf in the Super Smash Bros. series. Yacht Club's artists originally explored skirted designs for male Shield Knight, but these did not make the cut. Certain ornamental aspects of Shield Knight's armor were removed or reduced in size in order to make the character look more masculine.

Reception
Her initial design was described by Destructoid as a "female warrior who wields two shields of comically different size." As one of the features promised in the stretch goals was a "gender swap mode," both Destructoid and Nintendo Life wondered whether Shield Knight would be the heroine of this mode. Furthermore, Nintendo Life editor Thomas Whitehead was glad that the Shield Knight wasn't in any way similar to Princess Peach from the Super Mario series, while Technobuffalo described Shield Knight's role as another throwback to classic 2D platformers: "a daring knight out to rescue his lost love."

Kat Baily of USgamer praised the dream sequences in which the player as Shovel Knight needs to catch a slow falling Shield Knight. Inevitably, as the player is about to catch her, a flash of light appears and the titular character wakes up at a campfire. Baily described this as "a moment that reflects the medium's continued trend toward expressing emotion through gameplay" and states that she "wasn't expecting to find it in a retro platformer like Shovel Knight." Den of Geek described Shield Knight as a "simultaneous homage and inversion of an old concept," praising her role as half of Shovel Knight's team and the affecting impact her dream sequences made on the player. Shield Knight was called a "far cry from Princess Peach." Jake Muncy of Loser City described the loss of Shield Knight as the major theme throughout the game. He argued that this is not only reflected by the dream sequences, but also by the "very presence of the shielded enemies, whose shields you can bounce on using the head of your shovel like a pogo stick ... as Shovel Knight undoubtedly bounced on Shield Knight’s," which he described as "a mechanical reaffirmation of Shield Knight’s importance."

We Love Fine released a Shield Knight plush toy alongside a Plague Knight plush toy in July 2016.

References

Female characters in video games
Fictional knights in video games
Fictional shield fighters
Shovel Knight
Video game bosses
Video game characters introduced in 2014
Video game characters of selectable gender
Woman soldier and warrior characters in video games
Yacht Club Games